Bayswater Road is the main road running along the northern edge of Hyde Park in London. Originally part of the A40 road, it is now designated part of the A402 road.

Route

In the east, Bayswater Road originates at Marble Arch roadway at the Marble Arch junction, and at its western end it continues into Notting Hill Gate. It is mostly within the City of Westminster but a small portion of the road's western end lies in Kensington and Chelsea.

History
The road is part of the Via Trinobantia, an old Roman Road, later becoming a turnpike road. It had become known as Bayswater Road by the 1860s. The Swan Inn and Black Lion are both on Bayswater Road and were both established in the 18th century. In 1861, George Francis Train experimented with a horse tramway system on Bayswater Road.

Cultural references
J. M. Barrie lived at No. 100 Bayswater Road from 1902 to 1909, where he wrote Peter Pan. The street is where the fictional upper-middle class Forsyte family live in John Galsworthy's The Forsyte Saga.

The Bayswater Road Art Show takes place every Sunday. It is the largest regular open-air art exhibition in the world.

Notable sites
Tyburn Convent
Building № 10, London's "smallest house" which is sandwiched between buildings №9 and №11. Buildings №9 and №10 are both owned by the Tyburn Convent.
St George's Fields
Royal Lancaster Hotel
Bayswater Road Sunday Art Exhibition, at which over 250 artists exhibit original art on the Royal Park Railings between Lancaster Gate and Queensway tube stations every Sunday.
The Embassy of the Czech Republic is located at the junction with Kensington Palace Gardens
The High Commission of Guyana located opposite the Embassy of Russia
Park Modern

Transport
Lancaster Gate and Queensway stations (both on the London Underground's Central line) are located on Bayswater Road. Bayswater tube station is located near Queensway station and is on the Circle and District Lines.

London bus routes 94 and 148 run along the whole length of Bayswater Road. Bus route 274 starts at Lancaster Gate station in the road and serves the eastern part, while bus route 70 serves the western end.

References
Citations

Sources

External links
Tyburn Convent Website
View from a Bayswater Road CCTV camera (UK Traffic Delays)

Streets in the Royal Borough of Kensington and Chelsea
Streets in the City of Westminster